Akel is a surname. Notable people with the surname include:

Emad Akel (1965–1993), Hamas military commander
Friedrich Akel (1871–1941), Estonian diplomat and politician
Mohamed Akel (born 1993), Israeli football player
Omar al-Akel (born 1980), Syrian football player

Politics
Progressive Party of Working People (Ανορθωτικό Κόμμα Εργαζόμενου Λαού), a communist political party in Cyprus